The 2019 Philadelphia City Council elections were held on November 6, 2019. It took place on the same day as the 2019 Philadelphia mayoral election and other local elections in the United States.

Results

District 1

District 2

District 3

District 4

District 5

District 6

District 7

District 8

District 9

District 10

At-Large Seats

References 

2019 United States local elections
2019 Pennsylvania elections
Philadelphia City Council elections